Tasa de Santillán or Rate of Santillán was a rate of indigenous labor applied in the Captaincy General of Chile by Spanish governor García Hurtado de Mendoza, the first formal regulation of the system of encomiendas in Chile.  Promulgated in 1558, it was the first set of laws that regulated labor relations between the Spaniards and Mapuche natives.  Its creator was jurist Hernando de Santillán, who came with Garcia Hurtado de Mendoza to Chile.

Description 
The Rate was a system for indigenous labor, that instead of making all the natives work in a repartimiento, determined a system whereby they took turns doing the required  service.  The cacique of each tribe being forced to send a man for each six men in the encomienda for the operation of the mines, and one of each five for agricultural work. This worker, who until then had not been paid a wage, had to be remunerated with the sixth part of the product of his work. The form of remuneration the native was due, called Sesmo, was regular pay every month end, the sixth part that he extracted from the mine.  In addition the regulation exempted from this work women and men of under 18 and over 50 years old.  It established that the encomendero was to maintain the laborers in healthy condition and in addition that they procured their quick evangelisation. 

The duration of the Rate of Santillán in all their integrity did not last long and the governors who replaced Mendoza abolished it almost totally.  Actually, this rate allowed some Spaniards like Pedro Avendaño to greatly abuse the Indians in their encomiendas, sowing the seeds of future rebellions, especially among the Huilliche.  In replacement of the Rate of Santillán governor Martin Ruiz De Gamboa dictated a new rate in 1580 in a new decree, it was known as the Tasa de Gamboa.

See also 
 Tasa de Esquilache
 Tasa de Laso de la Vega

Encomenderos
Arauco War
Mapuche
1558 establishments in the Captaincy General of Chile
1558 in law